Megacraspedus sclerotricha is a moth of the family Gelechiidae. It was described by Edward Meyrick in 1904. It is found in Australia, where it has been recorded from New South Wales.

The forewings are light fuscous mixed with whitish, sometimes ochreous tinged and with a moderate rather undefined white costal streak from the base to four-fifths, narrowed posteriorly. The plical and second discal stigmata are dark fuscous, sometimes indistinct. The hindwings are grey or light grey.

References

Moths described in 1904
Megacraspedus